Deroplatys lobata, common name Southeast Asian dead leaf mantis or dead leaf mantis, is a species of praying mantis that inhabits Thailand, Java, Borneo, Indonesia, Sumatra and the Malay Peninsula.

Habitat 
Deroplatys lobata live on the ground around dead leaves and bushes in damp areas, tropical forests.

Description
This mantis mimics dead leaves.  Females are about 65 to 70mm in length and males are about 45mm in length.  1st instar nymphs are up to 15mm in length and 2nd instar nymphs are about 21mm in length when their abdomens are expanded.  Their coloring ranges from dark gray to light mottled gray, with many specimens exhibiting a slight pinkish 'flush' on the head and thorax. They also possess a broad prothorax that looks ripped and crumpled like a leaf.  Females have a wider shield than males as early as the 4th instar stage. Males have a slender body and a diamond shape shield.

Sexual Dimorphism
Due to sexual dimorphism typical of mantises, the male is much smaller.  Adult females are about 65mm to 70mm in length while adult males are about 45mm in length.  3rd instar nymphs cannot be sexed by counting the segments on the bottom of the abdomen because unlike most praying mantises 8 segments are visible in all of the 3rd instar nymphs and this is also true when they are in the 1st, 2nd instar stage and their leaf shapes look just about the same at those stages.  4th instar nymph and up their leaf shapes look different from each other and get more different from each other with each molt.  6 segments are seen on females while 8 segments are seen on males at the 4th instar and up.

Additional Images

See also
Dead leaf mantis
List of mantis genera and species

References

lobata
Mantodea of Southeast Asia
Insects of Thailand
Insects of Indonesia
Insects of Malaysia
Insects of Borneo
Insects of Java
Fauna of Sumatra
Peninsular Malaysia
Insects described in 1838